The Procurator to the General Assembly of the Church of Scotland is the principal legal advisor to the General Assembly of the Church of Scotland. The holder of the office is invariably a King's Counsel in Scotland. Day-to-day advice is given by the Church's own Law Department, headed by the Solicitor to the Church; the Procurator can be called on for specialist advice.

The current procurator is Laura Dunlop KC. Former procurators include Lord Davidson, Lord Penrose and Lord Hodge.

List of Procurators

Incomplete
1638 Archibald Johnston of Warriston (executed 22 July 1663)
1706-1731 John Dundas
1731-1745 Wlliam Grant
1746-1778 David Dalrymple
1778-1806 William Robertson
1806-1831 Sir John Connell
1831-1856 Robert Bell
1856-1869 Alexander Shank Cook
1869-1880 Robert Lee
1880-1886 William Mackintosh
1886-1891 Sir Charles Pearson
1891-1906 Sir John Cheyne
1907-1918 Sir Christopher Nicolson Johnston
1918-1922 William Watson
1929-1936 Sir William Chree KC LLD
1936-1937 Sir Archibald Campbell Black KC
1938-1948 James Frederick Strachan KC
1949-1957 Sir James Randal Philip OBE KC
1958-1968 Thomas Pringle McDonald QC
1969-1972 William Robertson Grieve QC
1972-   Charles Kemp Davidson

References

Church of Scotland
 
Scots law formal titles
Christian law
Region-specific legal occupations